Zee Sine was a Filipino language motion pictures-oriented channel in the Philippines. It was the first Indian Pay TV channel in the Philippines owned by Zee network of the Zee Entertainment Enterprises under the stewardship of Vinod Kumar, VP of Prase in Manila. This channel aired mostly Hindi-language (Bollywood) movies dubbed in Tagalog.

History
Following the success of Zee Nung (Thailand) and Zee Bioskop (Indonesia), the Zee Entertainment Enterprises launched another Southeast Asian channel of Zee Entertainment Group, this time in the Philippines. Zee Sine made its first airing date in April 2016. Zee Sine is available on SkyCable (Manila, Cebu and Davao only, since October 15, 2018; primarily included in Sky Basic package as a free channel and later as an add-on pay channel since July 15, 2019), CableLink, G-Sat Digital Cable TV and Easy TV. Zee Sine was also available on Cignal from April 2016 to September 2018. It was announced will ceased broadcast on March 1, 2020 at midnight.

Blocks and programs

Movie Blocks
Note: All featured movies are dubbed in Tagalog, with song sequences subtitled in Tagalog.

 Star of the Month 
 Bollywood Divas 
 Pinoy Bollywood Box Office

Other programming
(Note: Programs are aired in English audio and/or with English subtitles):

General Entertainment
 Look Who's Talking with Niranjan
 Starry Nights 2.O
 Music video fillers (if featured movie ended in at least 2 hours)
 Hello Bollywood (travel telemagazine)
 They're Not Just Sup(p)erstars

Drama Zeeries (Indian Hindi serials)
(Aired every Monday to Friday 3:00-6:00pm; with replays next day at 9:00am–12:00pm except that Friday episodes are aired on Monday the coming week)
 Fire and Ice
 Twist of Fate
 Mehek

(Aired on Saturdays and Sundays, 3:00-6:00pm)
 Kindred Hearts

Previously aired programs:
 Lies of the Heart
 Gangaa

References

External links
Official Website
Zee Sine

Zee Entertainment Enterprises
Television networks in the Philippines
Defunct television networks in the Philippines
Television channels and stations established in 2016
2016 establishments in the Philippines
Television channels and stations disestablished in 2020
2020 disestablishments in the Philippines
Filipino-language television stations
Movie channels in the Philippines